Mian Dar Zarneh (also Romanized as Mīān Dār Zarneh; also known as Mīān Dār) is a village in Zarneh Rural District, Zarneh District, Eyvan County, Ilam Province, Iran. At the 2006 census, its population was 33, in 6 families. The village is populated by Kurds.

References 

Populated places in Eyvan County
Kurdish settlements in Ilam Province